City Centre Deira (planned as Al Garhoud) is a rapid transit station on the Red Line of the Dubai Metro in Dubai, UAE.

History
City Centre Deira station opened on 9 September 2009 as part of the initial stretch of the Dubai Metro, with trains running from Rashidiya to Nakheel Harbour and Tower to City Centre Deira and seven other intermediate stations. In 2011,  City Centre Deira was the second-busiest Metro station, handling almost 5.592 million passengers.

On June 14, 2022, this station was renamed from "Deira City Centre" to "City Centre Deira".

Location
As its name suggests, City Centre Deira is at the heart of Deira, slightly to the historic centre of Dubai. Nearby are the City Centre Deira, after which the station is named, as well as the Dubai Clock Tower and a number of hotels.

Platform layout

References

Railway stations in the United Arab Emirates opened in 2009
Dubai Metro stations